Ghodazari Dam is an earthfill dam on Gorazari river near Nagbhid in Chandrapur district of the state of Maharashtra in India.

Specifications

Purpose
 Irrigation - Located in Nagbhid Tehsil in the Chandrapur District, the dam irrigates land in Nagbhid and Sindewahi Tehsil, especially the Talodhi and Nawargaon region.
 Tourism - The dam is located in the centre of a dense forest, but is easily accessible by road.   The surrounding jungle is full of flora and fauna.  The beauty of the area is complemented by the "British era" resthouse and the small garden near the dam.  In recent years the dam has become a notable location in the Chandrapur District because of the availability of a boating facility and srestaurants.

See also
 Dams in Maharashtra
 List of reservoirs and dams in India

References

Dams in Chandrapur district
Dams completed in 1923
1923 establishments in India